Kharkiv National University of Urban Economy (before 2013 — academy) is a Ukrainian university in Kharkiv, named after Alexei N. Beketov and specializing in urban development studies.

History
The educational institution was founded in 1922 as the All-Ukrainian College of Municipal Services. Since 1930 - the Kharkiv Institute of Public Utilities, and since 1935 - the Kharkiv Training School of Public Utilities, which included the Kharkiv Institute of Public Utilities and the College of Sustainable Construction. In 1938 the Kharkiv Institute of Public Utilities was renamed into Kharkiv Institute of Public Construction, and in 1939 - into Kharkiv Institute of Munipical Construction Engineers. In 1941, the Kharkiv Training School of Public Utilities was liquidated, the Kharkiv Institute of Municipal Construction Engineers and the College of Sustainable Construction were separated into separate educational institutions. 

In 1952-1959 Major General  was the head of the institute's military department.

In 1989 Kharkiv Institute of Municipal Construction Engineers was renamed into Kharkiv Institute of Municipal Engineers, 1994 - into Kharkiv State Academy of Urban Economy. In 2003, the academy received the status of a national one.

On July 19, 2008, the academy signed the Budapest Open Access Initiative and became its 436th member organization.

In 2013 the Kharkiv State Academy of Urban Economy was renamed into O.M. Beketov Kharkiv State University of Urban Economy.

In 2022, the Housing and Communal College of the university was destroyed by a Russian rocket strike. 

In 2023, a new strike destroyed part of the main building.

Campuses and buildings
The Academy has six academic buildings, education and research laboratories, a library with holdings of 882,000 books, a campus with six student hostels, an indoors sports facility with track and field gymnastics, bodybuilding, boxing, oriental martial art facilities and gyms.

Institutes and faculties
Town Planning Department
Economics and Entrepreneurship Department
Management Department
Department of Urban Environmental Engineering
Department for Electric Power Supply and Lighting Cities
Electrical Transport Department
Distance Learning Department
Foreign Students Department
Department for Increasing Qualification and Retraining Personnel
Department for Postgraduate Education and Distance Learning
Pre-university Department

References
Official site
Department of economic and financial safety, accounting and audit
Center of strategic analytics and anti-corruption management
Department of heat supply and cooling

1922 establishments in Ukraine
Educational institutions established in 1922
National universities in Ukraine